Ernst Ludwig von Aster (October 5, 1778 - February 10, 1855) was a German officer  and a highly decorated Prussian, Saxon and Russian general of the German Campaign of 1813 and the War of the Seventh Coalition. 

Aster took part in fortifying several fortresses, including in Cologne, Poznań and Königsberg. In his honor, in the Poznań Fortress and Koblenz Fortress forts were given the name of Aster.

References
 

1778 births
1855 deaths
Generals of Infantry (Prussia)
Imperial Russian Army generals
Saxon generals
Military personnel from Dresden
German commanders of the Napoleonic Wars
German military engineers